2015–16 Pirveli Liga was the 27th season of the Georgian Pirveli Liga. The season began on 2 September 2015 and finished on 21 May 2016.

Format
The tournament consisted of 18 teams. The first two teams went straight to the top of the Premier League, and the third place player had a Playoff with a 14th place finisher. However, due to a change of league format, eventually no team were promoted to the top division.

Teams and stadiums

Source:

League table

See also 
 2015–16 Umaglesi Liga
 2015–16 Georgian Cup

References

External links
 Results, fixtures, tables at Soccerway

Erovnuli Liga 2 seasons
2015–16 in Georgian football
Georgia